Szabolcs Zubai (born 31 March 1984) is a Hungarian handballer for Orosházi FKSE-LINAMAR.

He made his full international debut on 27 December 2004 against Slovakia. He participated in his first major international tournament two year later, finishing thirteenth at the 2006 European Championship. He took part in further five European Championships (2008, 2010, 2012, 2014, 2016), four World Championships (2009, 2011, 2013, 2017) and an Olympics (2012).

Achievements
Nemzeti Bajnokság I:
Golden Medalist: 2018
Silver Medalist: 2009, 2010, 2011, 2012, 2013, 2014, 2015, 2016, 2017
Bronze Medalist: 2002, 2003, 2004, 2005, 2006, 2007, 2008
Magyar Kupa:
Finalist: 2007, 2009, 2010, 2012, 2013, 2014, 2015, 2016, 2017, 2018
EHF Cup:
Winner: 2014
Junior World Championship:
Bronze Medalist: 2005

Individual awards
  Silver Cross of the Cross of Merit of the Republic of Hungary (2012)

References

External links
Szabolcs Zubai player profile on SC Pick Szeged official website
Szabolcs Zubai career statistics at Worldhandball

1984 births
Living people
Hungarian male handball players
People from Mezőkövesd
Handball players at the 2012 Summer Olympics
Olympic handball players of Hungary
SC Pick Szeged players
Sportspeople from Borsod-Abaúj-Zemplén County